Anderson Township is one of twelve townships in Rush County, Indiana. As of the 2020 Census data, the population is 1,153. There are a total of 477 houses.

History
Anderson Township was organized in 1830.

The Rush County Bridge No. 188 was listed on the National Register of Historic Places in 2000.

Geography

Unincorporated towns
 Milroy at 
 Williamstown at 
(This list is based on USGS data and may include former settlements.)

Other statistics
The median age of Anderson Township is 51.8 years old. The population is 51% female & 49% male. 96% of the population is white, while 4% is hispanic. A little under 1% are two or more races. The per capita income is $25,021 while the median household income is $54,583. There are 477 households in Anderson Township, with an average of 2.4 persons in each household.

References

External links
 Indiana Township Association
 United Township Association of Indiana

Townships in Rush County, Indiana
Townships in Indiana